Proboscivirus is a genus of viruses in the order Herpesvirales, in the family Herpesviridae, in the subfamily Betaherpesvirinae. Elephants serve as natural hosts. EEHV1 is apathogenic for African elephants but causes fatal haemorrhagic disease in Asian elephants. The name "Proboscivirus" comes from the Greek word  or "proboscis" meaning "the elephant trunk," for which the virus accordingly uses as its means of contraction and transmission (secretions or openings of the trunk) to enter the elephant's body.

Taxonomy 
Proboscivirus is located under the listings of the ICTV Updates as Section §2005.049-050V.04. With the creation of Proboscivirus as a new genus came the creation and categorization of a new species under this genus, by the name of Elephantid betaherpesvirus 1 (Acronym: EEHV1 and Scientific Name: Elephant endotheliotropic herpesvirus) under ICTV §2005.051-050V.04.

It was suggested by Pellett (2014) that the phylogenetic divergence of Proboscivirus from other genera in the subfamily Betaherpesvirinae warrants reassignment of the genus to a new subfamily that would be called Deltaherpesvirinae. However, the genus remains in the Betaherpesvirinae in currently accepted ICTV taxonomy.

Species 
The genus consists of the following species:

 Elephantid betaherpesvirus 1
 Elephantid betaherpesvirus 4
 Elephantid betaherpesvirus 5

Structure 
Viruses in Proboscivirus are enveloped, with icosahedral, spherical to pleomorphic, and round geometries, and T=16 symmetry. The diameter is around 150-200 nm. Genomes are linear and non-segmented.

Considering Proboscivirus is a herpesvirus, it is then unique in the sense that morphologically the virus is atypical to other viruses. According to University of Glasgow Immunology & Virology Professor, A.J. Davison, and his research team, the Proboscivirus morphology is a "linear, double-stranded DNA genome of 125-290 kbp contained within a T=16 icosahedral capsid, which is surrounded by [a] proteinaceous [mixture] and lipid envelope containing membrane-associated proteins". Species under the genus Proboscivirus tend to leave physical symptoms of cyanosis of the tongue, mouth/stomach ulcers, oedema of the head (or trunk for Elephants) on its host - often leading to death afterwards.

Life cycle 
Viral replication is nuclear, and is lysogenic. Entry into the host cell is achieved by attachment of the viral glycoproteins to host receptors, which mediates endocytosis. Replication follows the dsDNA bidirectional replication model. DNA-templated transcription, with some alternative splicing mechanism is the method of transcription. The virus exits the host cell by nuclear egress, and  budding.
Elephants serve as the natural host.

References

External links 

 Viralzone: Proboscivirus
 ICTV

Betaherpesvirinae
Virus genera